Ice Age: Collision Course is a 2016 American computer-animated adventure comedy film produced by Blue Sky Studios and distributed by 20th Century Fox. It is the sequel to Ice Age: Continental Drift (2012) and the fifth installment in the Ice Age film series. The film was directed by Michael Thurmeier. and stars Ray Romano, John Leguizamo, Denis Leary, Keke Palmer, Josh Peck, Simon Pegg, Seann William Scott, Wanda Sykes, Jennifer Lopez, and Queen Latifah reprising their roles from previous films, with Adam DeVine, Jesse Tyler Ferguson, Max Greenfield, Jessie J, and Nick Offerman voicing new characters. In the film, after Scrat is propelled into outer space in an abandoned spaceship during an attempt to bury his acorn and accidentally sends a giant asteroid towards Earth, Manny, the Herd, and Buck must go on a life-or-death mission to find a way to fend it off.

The film premiered at the Sydney Film Festival on June 19, 2016, and was released in the United States on July 22, 2016. The film received generally negative reviews from critics with Rotten Tomatoes calling it "unoriginal and unfunny". It grossed $408.5 million worldwide against a $105 million production budget, grossing below expectations in the US market, but faring better internationally. Ice Age: Collision Course was the final film in the Ice Age series to be produced by Blue Sky Studios before its closure on April 10, 2021. A standalone spin-off, titled The Ice Age Adventures of Buck Wild, was released in 2022 on Disney+. With the exception of Simon Pegg, who returned as the voice of Buck, none of the original actors in the spin-off reprised their roles.

Plot

Peaches is engaged to a good-natured mammoth named Julian, to Manny's disapproval, as he finds Julian annoying and incapable of protecting Peaches. The concern escalates when Peaches reveals her wish to travel and explore the world as their honeymoon, which both Manny and Ellie disagree with. Diego and Shira want to have children, but fear that they wouldn't make any friends, as the other kids are afraid of saber-toothed tigers. Sid is about to propose marriage to his girlfriend, Francine, but is dumped by her and laments his solitude. During Manny and Ellie's wedding anniversary party, asteroids (caused by Scrat, who was propelled into outer space in an abandoned spaceship during an attempt to bury his acorn) strike the place and the herd barely escape. Meanwhile, at the underground lost world, Buck returns a Chasmosaurus egg back to its mother after it was stolen by a trio of flying dromaeosaurs named Gavin, Gertie, and Roger. Buck discovers an ancient stone pillar and takes it to the surface, where he reunites with the herd.

Buck explains that according to the pillar, the asteroids had caused two extinctions in the past, and with the next one incoming, he believes that the only place they could find a clue to stop it is on the site of the impact of the previous ones; a nearby volcano, as according to its engravings, they always fall in the same place. However, the dromaeosaurs overhear their conversation, and Gavin and Gertie decide to stop them, believing that they could easily avoid the impact due to their natural ability to fly, thus not only getting their revenge on Buck, but also eradicating Earth's population and securing domination over the planet for the dinosaurs. Roger is reluctant, but Gavin and Gertie strong-arm him into cooperating. 

During the herd's journey to the crash site, Buck discovers that the asteroids have electro-magnetic properties, theorizing that if a huge quantity of smaller asteroids should be gathered and launched into orbit, they could attract the main asteroid away from Earth. After facing several obstacles and the interference of the dromaeosaurs, the herd arrives at "Geotopia", a community of immortal animals formed inside one of the asteroids that have fallen long ago, where Sid meets Brooke, a ground sloth who instantly falls in love with him.

However, Shangri Llama, the leader of Geotopia, refuses to cooperate with Buck's plan to use the city's crystals in order to stop the asteroid, as they are the key to the residents' longevity. Sid inadvertently destroys the entire city when he attempts to remove one of the crystals to present Brooke with, immediately aging them to their real ages and revealing their true crone-like appearances, much to Shangri Llama's anger.

After Brooke convinces the other Geotopians that stopping the asteroid is more important than their lost youth, they and the herd fill up a volcano with the gigantic ball made up of all the crystals so that the pressure launches them into space to draw the asteroid away. The dromaeosaurs attempt to intervene, but they soon discover that they will not survive the asteroid's impact. Buck convinces them to help and that the dinosaurs can live with them in harmony. After a small meteor hits Gavin, they accidentally drop the last and biggest crystal, but Manny and Julian work together to throw it back into the volcano, causing Julian to earn Manny's approval. The volcano then erupts, sending the magnetic crystal shards to the sky, which diverts the oncoming asteroid plummeting back to space.

The herd then departs for home, including Sid, who parts ways with Brooke, but just after they leave, a small crystal shard falls inside a hot spring, giving it rejuvenating properties and making the Geotopians and Granny, who stayed behind with them, regain their youth. After the herd returns, Manny and Ellie reconcile with Peaches, encouraging her to chase her dreams. Peaches and Julian marry afterwards while Diego and Shira become heroes to the kids, and a rejuvenated Brooke appears during the wedding ceremony to reunite with Sid, much to his delight.

Cast

 Ray Romano as Manny, a woolly mammoth and the leader of The Herd
 John Leguizamo as Sid, a ground sloth and the founder of The Herd
 Denis Leary as Diego, a saber tooth tiger and the co-leader of The Herd
 Adam DeVine as Julian, a woolly mammoth and Peaches's fiancé
 Jesse Tyler Ferguson as Shangri Llama, a yoga-loving llama and the spiritual leader of Geotopia
 Max Greenfield as Roger, a freaky and cowardly dromaeosaur and Gavin's son
 Jessie J as Brooke, a ground sloth who is a resident of Geotopia and the love interest of Sid
 Nick Offerman as Gavin, a handsome dromaeosaur and the father of Roger and Gertie
 Keke Palmer as Peaches, a young female woolly mammoth – Manny and Ellie's daughter
 Seann William Scott and Josh Peck as Crash and Eddie, two opossums and Ellie's brothers
 Simon Pegg as Buck, a one-eyed weasel and a dinosaur hunter who reunites with The Herd to warn them of the coming asteroid 
 Wanda Sykes as Granny, an aging ground sloth and Sid's grandmother
 Jennifer Lopez as Shira, a female saber tooth tiger – Diego's wife and former first mate pirate
 Queen Latifah as Ellie, a female woolly mammoth – Manny's wife
 Stephanie Beatriz as Gertie, a dromaeosaur and Gavin's daughter
 Neil deGrasse Tyson as Neil deBuck Weasel, a weasel astronomer who exists in Buck's mind
 Lilly Singh as Bubbles and Misty, a pair of "minicorns" who reside in Geotopia.
 Michael Strahan as Teddy, a fearless rabbit and a resident of Geotopia.
 Melissa Rauch as Francine, a ground sloth who has a close relationship with Sid as she is his former girlfriend
 Chris Wedge as Scrat, a saber tooth squirrel

Production
The concept of Collision Course was deeply rooted in a scene from the first Ice Age film where Manny, Sid, Diego and Roshan are walking through an ice cave and they spot a spaceship that's encased in ice, an item that inspired this film in the series. As with the third film, which was also inspired by the ice cave scene in which The Herd comes across a dinosaur that was encased in ice, the team went back to the first film to search for a possible inspiration for this next installment. The characters were first hand-drawn on animation software, complete with color and animated clips of the characters doing specific actions. They were then sent to be hand-sculpted with clay, and ultimately scanned into CGI software and animated around the model.

The "Figaro's Aria" sequence which involved Buck saving an egg from a trio of dromaeosaurs proved to be one of the most challenging sequences for Blue Sky Studios' animators, as it involved a continuous uninterrupted shot that ran for around two minutes long. It was one of the first scenes put into production but also one of the last to exit production due to its time-consuming and difficult structure, as the team would only be able to produce three or four seconds of footage a week.

The recording session took place in Los Angeles, California since most of the actors live there while the studio is based in New York. Director Michael Thurmeier and co-director Galen Tan Chu would take turns travelling to L.A. to head the recording sessions. In the film, Simon Pegg sang a rendition of "Figaro". Jesse Tyler Ferguson was offered the role after the producers saw his performance in Modern Family. It is his first time working in an animated film. Ferguson blew out his voice on the first day of the recording session because he did a lot of yelling. He then took a few days off and came back later to finish his part. He admitted that he struggled the first time he heard his voice come out of his character's mouth. As a result, he decided to stop watching interviews of himself on television because he found them to be "too weird".

A promotional poster, shown in June 2015, at the Licensing Expo, revealed the film's full title: Ice Age: Collision Course.

Music
The film score was composed by John Debney, who replaced John Powell from the previous three films due to Powell being busy with other projects. However, most of Powell's score from the third film was included, along with David Newman's score from the first film. Jessie J performed a song dubbed "Superstar" as a contribution to the film.

Release
Ice Age: Collision Course was originally scheduled for release on July 15, 2016. However, it was delayed to July 22, in order to avoid competition with the Ghostbusters reboot that was also scheduled for July 15. An extended sneak peek of the movie in the form of a short film called Cosmic Scrat-tastrophe was attached to theatrical showings of Blue Sky Studios' The Peanuts Movie on November 6, 2015. The teaser poster of the film was revealed on November 6, 2015, with the words "Bring Scrat Home" spoofing The Martian. The short film was released later on November 9, 2015, on 20th Century Fox's official YouTube page.

Home media
Ice Age: Collision Course was released by 20th Century Fox Home Entertainment on DVD, Blu-ray, Blu-ray 3D, 4K Blu-ray and digital download on October 11, 2016. Special features include a new short film titled Scrat: Spaced Out, which is primarily made up of Scrat's scenes from the film, with a few unique scenes at the end.

Ice Age: Collision Course was released on The Walt Disney Company's streaming service Disney+ on July 3, 2020.

Cosmic Scrat-tastrophe
Cosmic Scrat-tastrophe is a five-minute short film, with the majority of its footage, minus the closing scene, taken from the beginning of Ice Age: Collision Course. Directed by Michael Thurmeier and Galen Chu, the short premiered on November 6, 2015, along with the film The Peanuts Movie. In the short, Scrat, trying to bury his acorn, accidentally activates an abandoned alien ship that takes him into deep space, where he unwittingly sends several asteroids en route to a collision with Earth.

Scrat: Spaced Out
Scrat: Spaced Out is a short film that compiles all Scrat's scenes from Ice Age: Collision Course with a few unique scenes at the end. The short was included on the film's home media releases.

Following the events of Ice Age: Collision Course, Scrat is heading back to Earth in the saucer. An acorn-shaped ship appears and pulls the acorn, with Scrat holding onto it. In the ship, three alien squirrels (A.K.A Scratzons) are surprised by finding Scrat, and blast him away from the acorn. Scrat tries to take it back with a tractor beam in a nearby saucer, but the alien leader pulls it back with another tractor beam. Being pulled to both sides, the nutrogen inside the acorn snaps, creating a massive explosion, which destroys the ship and creates a black hole sucking everything nearby into it. Scrat jumps out of the saucer, knocks the Scratazon alien leader into the black hole while trying to save the acorn, but gets pulled in the hole nonetheless. He emerges in space along with the acorn, only for the black hole appearing again, snatching the acorn and leaving Scrat alone again. The short ends with the latter screaming in frustration.

Reception

Box office
Ice Age: Collision Course grossed $64 million in North America and $344 million in other territories for a worldwide total of $408.5 million, against a production budget of $105 million. In terms of total earnings, its biggest markets outside of North America were China ($66 million) (with the country being also its largest territory overall), France ($26.3 million), Brazil ($25 million), Germany ($24.7 million) and Mexico ($22.2 million).

In the United States and Canada Ice Age: Collision Course opened on July 22, 2016, alongside Star Trek Beyond and Lights Out, and was projected to gross $30–35 million from 3,997 theaters in its opening weekend. It made $850,000 from Thursday night previews and $7.8 million on its first day. It had a $21 million debut in its opening weekend, finishing fourth at the box office. The film finished its theatrical run with a domestic gross of $64 million. Produced on a budget of $105 million, the film became the lowest-grossing film of the franchise as well as Blue Sky's lowest-grossing film, causing the film to become a box office bomb in the North American market.

The film began its international theatrical run two weeks prior to its North American release, earning $18 million from seven markets on about 5,286 screens. In its second weekend, it added $32.2 million from 25 countries. As a result, it only topped the international box office for a non-Chinese film but also helped Fox pass the $2 billion mark internationally, making this the eighth consecutive calendar year Fox has surpassed this milestone, and the 10th time in the studio's history. The film came in third place overall, behind the two Chinese films Cold War 2 and Big Fish & Begonia. By its third weekend, after grossing another $53.5 million from 15,132 screens in a total 51 markets, it finally topped the international box office and became the biggest grosser of the weekend.

It recorded the biggest opening of all time for Fox in Argentina ($3.77 million), where its debut is also the third-biggest of all time behind Furious 7 and Captain America: Civil War; Colombia ($2.18 million), Central America ($2.2 million), and Uruguay ($620,618); the second-biggest in Mexico ($8.4 million), behind Ice Age: Continental Drift; Peru, Chile, and Ecuador; the biggest opening among the series in Brazil ($4.5 million) and the biggest non-holiday animated opening ever in India ($1.66 million). Elsewhere, it had No. 1 openings in Russia ($5.9 million), Italy ($4.5 million), Germany ($4.2 million), Austria ($893,350), and Switzerland ($514,789) and No. 5 in Australia ($3.1 million). In France, it opened amidst the 2016 Nice truck attack and delivered an opening weekend of $7.1 million. In the United Kingdom and Ireland, it debuted in second place with $5.2 million, behind Ghostbusters which also opened the same weekend. In China, it opened on Tuesday, August 23, alongside Jason Bourne and delivered a six-day opening of $42.7 million and a Friday to Sunday debut of $23.1 million. The debut makes it the top non-local animated opening in the country that year and is also the franchise's best debut. It has so far grossed a total of $63.6 million there.

Critical response
The site's critical consensus reads, "Unoriginal and unfunny, Ice Age: Collision Course offers further proof that not even the healthiest box office receipts can keep a franchise from slouching toward creative extinction." Rotten Tomatoes also ranks Collision Course as the worst-reviewed of all the five films in the Ice Age franchise. On Metacritic, the film has a weighted average score of 34 out of 100 based on reviews from 27 critics, indicating "generally unfavorable reviews". Audiences polled by CinemaScore gave the film an average grade of "B+" on an A+ to F scale.

Katie Walsh of Los Angeles Times gave the film a negative review, writing that "Collision Course is simply a perfunctory, watered-down entry in the series that feels like it should have been released on home video." Peter Travers of Rolling Stone gave the film one out of four stars, saying, "The fifth entry in the Ice Age series is a loud, lazy, laugh-starved cash grab that cynically exploits its target audience (I use the term advisedly) by serving them scraps and calling it yummy."

Owen Gleiberman of Variety gave the film a positive review, saying that "The long-running series returns to form with an infectious chatterbox comedy about the end of the world as we know it."

Future

Sequel and spin-off
On the possibility of a sequel, co-director Galen T. Chu stated in June 2016 that there were some ideas for the sixth installment. In July 2016, Bustle noted that the chances of a sixth entry were relatively high but would depend on the box office performance of the fifth film. A spin-off film, developed for streaming on Disney+, was titled The Ice Age Adventures of Buck Wild and centered around Buck going on an adventure in the Dinosaur World with Crash and Eddie. Simon Pegg reprised his role as the title character, being the only cast member from the film series to do so. The film was released on January 28, 2022.

Scrat Tales
On May 4, 2021, it was revealed that a short series produced by Blue Sky Studios known as Scrat Tales would be coming to Disney+, having been completed by the company before their dissolution the previous month. The series will follow the titular Scrat, who discovers that he has a son. Footage was later leaked onto YouTube, with former Blue Sky animators revealing that the series will be coming to Disney+ in 2022 after The Ice Age Adventures of Buck Wild. A plush for the character of Scrat's son was also unveiled via Just Play Products’ website, with the second image featuring a blue tag containing the logo for Scrat Tales, although the listing was retitled under The Ice Age Adventures of Buck Wild to promote the spin-off film. The series was released as a Disney+ original series on April 13, 2022.

References

External links

 
 
 

20th Century Fox films
2016 films
2010s American animated films
2010s adventure comedy films
2010s science fiction comedy films
2010s disaster films
2016 3D films
2016 computer-animated films
American 3D films
American adventure comedy films
American animated science fiction films
American science fiction comedy films
American computer-animated films
American disaster films
American science fiction adventure films
American space adventure films
American sequel films
Animated space adventure films
Animated films about animals
Animated films about llamas
Animated films about squirrels
Apocalyptic films
Films scored by John Debney
Films produced by Lori Forte
Films set in outer space
Films with screenplays by Michael Berg
Films with screenplays by Michael J. Wilson
Ice Age (franchise) films
Films about impact events
20th Century Fox animated films
20th Century Fox Animation films
Blue Sky Studios films
2010s science fiction adventure films
Films directed by Mike Thurmeier
2016 directorial debut films
2016 comedy films
2010s English-language films
Disaster comedy films